East Glebe and Potomac, was a temporary bus rapid transit station in Alexandria, Virginia, located on Potomac Avenue and East Glebe Road. It was a stop on the portion of the mixed-traffic segment of the Metroway bus rapid transit line, providing two-way service along the route. The station provided service to the central Potomac Yard and Potomac communities in Alexandria.

History 

The station opened for service on May 25, 2019.  It was instituted to ameliorate the impact of the Metrorail Platform Improvement Project, which shut down all Metrorail stations south of the Washington National Airport station for the entire summer of 2019.

References

External links 

 Official Metroway site

Buildings and structures in Alexandria, Virginia
Metroway
2019 establishments in Virginia
Transport infrastructure completed in 2019
Bus stations in Virginia